Katrina Adams and Manon Bollegraf won the first edition of the tournament, defeating Katerina Maleeva and Nathalie Tauziat 6–4, 6–4 in the final.

Seeds

Draw

References
Main Draw

Challenge Bell
Tournoi de Québec
Can